Kim Chae-won (born August 1, 2000), is a South Korean singer. She is the leader of South Korean girl group Le Sserafim. She is also a former member of the reality competition series Produce 48's resulting girl group Iz*One in 2018.

Early life and education 
Kim Chae-won was born on August 1, 2000, in Gangnam, Seoul, South Korea. Her family consists of her parents and an older sister. Her mother is the theater actress Lee Ran-hee. Kim attended Seoul Poi Elementary School, Guryong Middle School, and Gaepo High School. She later transferred to Hanlim Multi Art School, graduating in 2019. In 2012, Kim performed in KBS' Korea Children's Song Contest.

Career

2018–2021: Produce 48 and Iz*One 

In 2018, Kim participated in the South Korean survival show Produce 48 by Mnet, representing Woollim Entertainment alongside Kwon Eun-bi, and Su-yun and So-hee of Rocket Punch. Prior to joining the survival show, Kim trained under Woollim Entertainment for 11 months. She finished in 10th place earning 238,192 votes, allowing her to debut in Iz*One, with labelmate Kwon Eun-bi. Kim officially debuted as a member of Iz*one on October 29, 2018, with the release of their first extended play (EP) Color*Iz and its lead single "La Vie en Rose".

In 2020, Kim was first credited for music composition on Oneiric Diary, for the track "With*One". She also contributed to writing lyrics for the song "Slow Journey", featured on Iz*One's final EP, One-reeler / Act IV.

In March 2021, Kim competed in King of Mask Singer under the name "Formosan Deer". On March 13 and 14, Iz*One held their final concert, One, The Story. The group's contract officially expired on April 29, 2021.

After the dissolution of Iz*One, Kim returned to her parent company, Woollim Entertainment. She, alongside Kwon Eun-bi, participated together in a few magazine shoots for Esquire Magazine, Indeed Magazine, and Singles Magazine.

2022–present: Debut with Le Sserafim

On March 14, 2022, Source Music announced that Kim, alongside former Iz*One member, Sakura Miyawaki, signed exclusive contracts with the company, and were confirmed to debut in their new girl group Le Sserafim.

Kim was revealed as the group's fourth member and leader on April 7.  Kim made her debut as a member of Le Sserafim on May 2, 2022, with their extended play, Fearless.

Discography

Composition credits

Filmography

Film

Television shows

Web series

Music videos appearances

Notes

References

External links
 

2000 births
Living people
21st-century South Korean women singers
Iz*One members
Le Sserafim members
Produce 48 contestants
South Korean women pop singers
South Korean female idols
Singers from Seoul
Hanlim Multi Art School alumni
Hybe Corporation artists
Japanese-language singers of South Korea